Miho Yamada (born June 21, 1973, Chofu, Tokyo) is a retired Japanese rhythmic gymnast.

She competed for Japan in the individual rhythmic gymnastics all-around competition at two Olympic Games: in 1992 in Barcelona and in 1996 in Atlanta. In 1992 was 18th in the qualification round and didn't advance to the final. In 1996 she again was 18th in the qualification round and advanced to the semifinal. In the semifinal she placed 20th of 20, not advancing to the final.

References

External links 
 

1973 births
Living people
Japanese rhythmic gymnasts
Gymnasts at the 1992 Summer Olympics
Gymnasts at the 1996 Summer Olympics
Olympic gymnasts of Japan
People from Chōfu, Tokyo
Gymnasts from Tokyo
Asian Games medalists in gymnastics
Gymnasts at the 1994 Asian Games
Asian Games bronze medalists for Japan
Medalists at the 1994 Asian Games
20th-century Japanese women